Sri Raghavendrar is a 1985 Tamil-language Hindu mythological film directed by S. P. Muthuraman and was produced by Kavithalayaa Productions. The film stars Rajinikanth, portraying the title character, in his 100th film. Lakshmi, Vishnuvardhan, Delhi Ganesh and Nizhalgal Ravi play prominent roles. The film is based on the life of Hindu saint Raghavendra Tirtha. The soundtrack was composed by Ilaiyaraaja and lyrics were written by Vaali. The dialogues for the film were written by A. L. Narayanan.

The cinematography was handled by T. S. Vinayagam while the editing was handled by the duo R. Vittal and S. B. Mohan. The film was released on 1 September 1985 to positive reception with Rajinikanth's performance as a saint was widely praised. received positive reviews from critics.

Plot 

This film is the life of Raghavendra Tirtha, from Birth till his Mahasamadhi.

Cast 
 Rajinikanth as Raghavendra Tirtha
 Lakshmi as Saraswati Bai
 Vishnuvardhan as Sri Yogenthra Tirtha
 Sathyaraj as Maqbool Khan, Nawab of Adoni
 Mohan as Mukuntha
 Ambika as Aparajita
 Somayajulu as Sri Sudeendrar
 K.R.Vijaya as Devi Saraswathy
 Delhi Ganesh as Appanacharya (foremost disciple)
 Major Sundarrajan as King of Tanjavore
 Y. G. Mahendra as Guru Sri Sudeendrar's disciple
 Thengai Srinivasan as Priest
 Poornam Viswanathan as a Devotee whose son accidentally dies but revived by Sri Raghavendra
 V.S. Raghavan as Srinivasacharya Devotee
 Nizhalgal Ravi as Venkanna
 Senthamarai as Tamil Poet
 Janagaraj as Guru Sri Sudeendrar's disciple
 S. R. Veeraraghavan as Seemaachar
 Srikanth as Devotee who is blessed by Sri Raghavendra who protects this family by killing the demon character
 G. Srinivasan as "Lower caste" person mistreated by V.S.Raghavan's character initially but blessed by Sri Raghavendra
 Manorama as Saraswathi Bai's friend
 Gopu
 Vennira Aadai Moorthy
 C. Vasantha as Poornam Viswanathan's wife

Production 
Sri Raghavendra was Rajinikanth's 100th film (including his other language films). The film featured him in the role of the saint Raghavendra Tirtha, different from the larger-than-life characters which he is known for and portrayed. Rajinikanth, a fan of Kannada actor Rajkumar, had seen his film Mantralaya Mahatme where Rajkumar portrayed Raghavendra. Rajinikanth approached S. P. Muthuraman to direct the film. Muthuraman was initially reluctant to direct a devotional film, but Balachander encouraged and convinced him to take up the film. To prepare himself to direct the film, Muthuraman watched various devotional films directed by A. P. Nagarajan who was known for such films. Prior to the start of the film, the team took the script first to the Swami's abode in Mantralayam, and got it blessed. They did the same thing with the first copy, post-completion. Muthuraman said that during the 90-day schedule, all the cast and crew of the film undergone the ritual of fasting on Thursday in reverence to lord's presence considering it was the mythological film.

Soundtrack 
Soundtrack was composed by Ilaiyaraaja and lyrics for all songs were written by Vaali. The song "Parthale Theriyadha" is based on Anandabhairavi raga. The song "Aadal Kalaiye" is based on Charukesi raga. The song "Azhaikiran Madhavan" is based on Subhapantuvarali raga. The song "Ramanamam" is based on Mayamalavagowla raga. The song "Mazhaikkoru" is based on Amruthavarshini raga. The song "Unakum Enakum" was later reused by American Musical group Black Eyed Peas's bonus track "The Elephunk Theme" from their 2003 album Elephunk.

Reception 
The film received tax exemption from Tamil Nadu government, and received positive reviews, primarily for Rajinikanth's performance, but became a box-office bomb. Despite this Rajinikanth won three awards for his performance: the Film Fans Association Award for Best Actor, Cinema Express Award for Best Actor – Tamil and Filmalaya Award for Best Actor. The film itself frequently features on lists compiling Rajinikanth's best films, and he considers it a personal favourite film. Jayamanmadhan of Kalki praised Rajinikanth for scoring a century and choosing a role which is one of the hundred for his 100th film something that will make proud.

References

External links 

1980s Tamil-language films
1985 films
Films directed by S. P. Muthuraman
Films scored by Ilaiyaraaja
Hindu mythological films